Dağ Cəyir (also, Dag Dzheir, Dagdzhagir, and Dzhagir) is a village and municipality in the Shamkir Rayon of Azerbaijan.  It has a population of 1,042.

References 

Populated places in Shamkir District